Mishar, or Mior Shariman Hassan, was a Malaysian cartoonist whose career started in the 1960s. He worked as an illustrator and writer at the Institute of Language and Literature. Also he worked with the Utusan Melayu newspaper.

See also
 Gila-Gila

References

Malaysian cartoonists
Malaysian comics artists
1947 births
Living people